Nam Le (Vietnamese: Lê Nam; born 1978) is a Vietnamese-born Australian writer, who won the Dylan Thomas Prize for his book The Boat, a collection of short stories. His stories have been published in many places including Best Australian Stories 2007, Best New American Voices, Zoetrope: All-Story, A Public Space and One Story. In 2008 he was named a 5 under 35 honoree by the National Book Foundation.

Life and early career

Nam Le came to Australia from Vietnam with his parents, when he was less than a year old, as a boat refugee. He attended Melbourne Grammar School and the University of Melbourne, from which he graduated with a BA (Hons) and LLB (Hons). His Arts thesis supervisor was the Australian poet Chris Wallace-Crabbe. He worked as a corporate lawyer and was admitted to the Supreme Court of Victoria in 2003/2004.

Le decided to turn to writing, and in 2004 attended the Iowa Writers' Workshop in the United States where he completed a master's degree in creative writing. He became fiction editor at the Harvard Review. His first short story was published in Zoetrope in 2006. Nam Le also held fellowships at the Fine Arts Work Center in Provincetown in 2006, and at the Phillips Exeter Academy, in 2007.

In an interview on Australian ABC radio, he said he turned from law to writing due to his love of reading: "I loved reading, and if you asked me why I decided to become a writer, that's the answer right there, because I was a reader and I was just so enthralled and thrilled by the stuff that I'd read that I just thought; what could be better? How could you possibly better spend your time than trying to recreate that feeling for other people". In the same interview he said that his first writing was poetry.

He returned to Australia in 2008, but is moving to Great Britain to take up a writing fellowship at the University of East Anglia.

When asked about his source of inspiration, Nam Le said in 2008 that "I’d say I’m most inspired by my parents for the choices and sacrifices they’ve made. It still boggles me".

Style
Regarding his style, Nam Le said in an interview that "one of the demarcations is writers that deal primarily with language, the more lyrical minded writers, and writers that are more structurally oriented. I always used to...I started out writing poetry and reading poetry, and so I always knew that that was the side that I was most predisposed to, and so I actually had to be quite careful in these stories to not overdo that impulse, to not throw too many images or indulge too many lyrical flights of fancy."

The Boat

The book, first published in 2008, comprises seven short stories which take the reader to such places as Colombia, New York City, Iowa, Tehran, Hiroshima, and small-town Australia. In the opening story,  Love and Honor and Pity and Pride and Compassion and Sacrifice, he writes about a Vietnamese-born character called Nam Le who is attending a writing workshop in Iowa. In a conversation with Michael Williams he said about the practice of using a narrator close to "self" in a story:
A lot of people presume if I'm writing a narrator who has clear parallels to me, that's just sheer inertia; that there's a natural adaptation from so-called life to so-called text. But any careful reader or writer would understand how much artifice and contrivance go into making this self-standing and self-contained. Actually it's tougher: if I stick in something that has more resonance for me than is communicated on the page, then that's a failure of my charge as a writer . . . I'm not creating a good enough space for the reader to come in and fully partake in that scene or that language or that line."

Each story provides "a snapshot of a pivotal point in the characters' lives".

Nam Le has said of his Vietnamese heritage and writing that:My relationship with Vietnam is complex. For a long time I vowed I wouldn’t fall into writing ethnic stories, immigrant stories, etc. Then I realized that not only was I working against these expectations (market, self, literary, cultural), I was working against my kneejerk resistance to such expectations. How I see it now is no matter what or where I write about, I feel a responsibility to the subject matter. Not so much to get it right as to do it justice. Having personal history with a subject only complicates this – but not always, nor necessarily, in bad ways. I don’t completely understand my relationship to Vietnam as a writer. This book is a testament to the fact that I’m becoming more and more okay with that.

Australian short story writer Cate Kennedy, interviewing Nam Le, said that The Boat has put the short story back in "the literary centre stage".

Awards and nominations
2010: PEN/Malamud Award
2009: Anisfield-Wolf Book Award
2009: Prime Minister's Literary Award for Fiction: Winner of the $100,000 (AUS) prize for "The Boat"
2009: Queensland Premier's Literary Awards Australian Short Story Collection - Arts Queensland Steele Rudd Award
2009: Vance Palmer Prize for Fiction: Shortlisted for The Boat
2009: New South Wales Premier's Literary Awards Book of the Year and UTS Glenda Adams Award for New Writing for The Boat
2008: Dylan Thomas Prize for The Boat
2008: National Book Foundation's "5 Under 35" Award
2008: Frank O'Connor International Short Story Award: Longlisted
2007: Pushcart Prize
2007: Michener-Copernicus Fellowship

External links

References

1978 births
Living people
Vietnamese refugees
Australian people of Vietnamese descent
Australian male short story writers
Academics of the University of East Anglia
Writers of Vietnamese descent
Academics of Vietnamese descent
Iowa Writers' Workshop alumni
Vietnamese writers
PEN/Malamud Award winners
English-language literature of Vietnam